Bilram is a town and a Nagar Panchayat in Kasganj district in the state of Uttar Pradesh, India.

Demographics
As of the 2001 Census of India, Bilram had a population of 12,119. Males constitute 54% of the population and females 46%. Bilram has an average literacy rate of 29%, lower than the national average of 59.5%; with male literacy of 37% and female literacy of 20%. 18% of the population is under 6 years of age.

References

Cities and towns in Kasganj district